Dmitriy Koshkin (born April 20, 1986 in Novosibirsk, Russia) is an alpine skier competing for Kazakhstan. He competed for Kazakhstan at the 2014 Winter Olympics in the alpine skiing events. He previously competed for his native Russia.

References

1986 births
Living people
Olympic alpine skiers of Kazakhstan
Alpine skiers at the 2014 Winter Olympics
Kazakhstani male alpine skiers
Russian male alpine skiers
Sportspeople from Novosibirsk
Asian Games medalists in alpine skiing
Alpine skiers at the 2011 Asian Winter Games
Asian Games gold medalists for Kazakhstan
Asian Games silver medalists for Kazakhstan
Medalists at the 2011 Asian Winter Games